The ABCs of Rock is a half-hour-long music program on the Canadian Music Video Channel MuchMoreMusic. The show picks a letter each episode and lists artists, albums, trivia questions and events in pop-culture, then lists them during the episode.

Episodes

Production crew
Producers: Jessica Capobianco, Greg Miller, Bob Pagrach
Editor: Michael Burshtyn

MuchMoreMusic original programming
Television series by Bell Media